Aljaž Bedene defended his title by defeating Potito Starace 6–2, 6–0 in the final.

Seeds

Draw

Finals

Top half

Bottom half

References
 Main Draw
 Qualifying Draw

Open Barletta Trofeo Dimiccoli and Boraccino - Singles
2012 Singles